Philipp-Ernst, Prince of Schaumburg-Lippe (Friedrich August Philipp-Ernst Wolrad; 26 July 1928 – 28 August 2003) was a head of the Princely House of Schaumburg-Lippe.

Biography
He was born in Hagenburg, the second son of Prince Wolrad of Schaumburg-Lippe and his wife Princess Bathildis of Schaumburg-Lippe (1903–1983). Following the death of his uncle Prince Adolf II in a plane crash in 1936, Philipp-Ernst's father Wolrad became the new head of the House of Schaumburg-Lippe.

After his older brother, Hereditary Prince Georg-Wilhelm, was killed in action at Nössige, Saxony, on 29 April 1945 during the second world war, Philipp-Ernst became the new heir apparent to the House of Schaumburg-Lippe. Philipp-Ernst succeeded to the headship of the house on the death of his father on 15 June 1962, and he remained head until his death at Bückeburg, when he was succeeded by his only surviving son, Alexander.

Marriage and children

He was married to Eva-Benita Freiin von Tiele-Winckler (1927–2013) at Bückeburg on 3 October 1955. They had two sons, with the elder Georg-Wilhelm dying in a motorcycle accident in 1983.

Georg-Wilhelm (1956–1983)
Alexander (born 1958)

Ancestry

 

1928 births
2003 deaths
People from Schaumburg
House of Lippe
Princes of Schaumburg-Lippe
German royalty
Pretenders to the throne of Schaumburg-Lippe